The 1913 Giro d'Italia was the fifth edition of the Giro d'Italia, one of cycling's Grand Tours. The field consisted of 99 riders, and 35 riders finished the race. Except for the Swiss Emile Guyon, all riders were Italian.

References

1913 Giro d'Italia
1913